Weale's running frog (Semnodactylus wealii), also known as Weale's frog, rattling frog, and many other commons names, is a species of frog in the family Hyperoliidae. It is monotypic within the genus Semnodactylus. It is found in southern and eastern South Africa, Lesotho, and Eswatini.

Etymology
The specific name wealii honours James Philip Mansel Weale, an English amateur entomologist who farmed in Bedford, Eastern Cape, and sent specimens to England.

Description
The limbs are thin and long. The dorsum is yellowish-brownto grey and has three dark longitudinal bands, each with a pale center. The flanks have a dark stripe or a series of blotches. The concealed parts of the limbs are yellow to orange. The throat in breeding males is black.

The male advertisement call is a low-pitched creak, resembling the sound of a cork being removed from a bottle.

Habitat and conservation
Weale's running frog is a common frog mostly occurring in grassland habitats at elevations below ; in Western Cape it is also found in fynbos heath. It breeds in all sort of ponds (both permanent and temporary, and natural and artificial) that have emergent vegetation. It is present in many protected areas, tolerates disturbance, and is not facing any major threats.

References

Hyperoliidae
Monotypic amphibian genera
Frogs of Africa
Amphibians of South Africa
Amphibians of Eswatini
Vertebrates of Lesotho
Amphibians described in 1882
Taxonomy articles created by Polbot